Mama Digdown's Brass Band is an eight-piece American brass band from Madison, Wisconsin.

History
Mama Digdown's Brass Band was formed by two former University of Wisconsin-Madison music students, Erik Jacobson and Christopher "Roc" Ohly. The group played its first shows in Madison, Wisconsin in 1993, at the local Art Fair on the Square. They released four full-length albums over the next several years, and followed with the live album Delicious, recorded in Madison, in late 2002.

The group has done concert tours across the United States and Europe. Their 2006 live album Ascona was recorded at a Switzerland jazz festival. In December 2009 they released their fifth studio album, We Make 'Em Say Ooh, and followed up the album's release with shows during Mardi Gras season in New Orleans. They are planning to release an album of Michael Jackson covers entitled Brass Jackson in 2016.

Discography
North of New Orleans (1996)
Big Boy (1998)
Slippery 7 (1999)
Mama's House (2001)
Delicious: Live at the King Club (2002)
The Digdown Decade (2005)
Ascona (2006)
We Make 'Em Say Ooh (2009)
Live (2012)
Bootleg Series Vol. 1: Majestic Theater, Madison 1.7.17 (2017)
Outstanding b/w Just the Two of Us (2020)
Bootleg Series Vol. 2: Live at the Green Mill 2005 (2021)

Members
Current
Erik Jacobsen - Sousaphone / Leader
Christopher 'Roc' Ohly - Saxophone / Leader
Jeff 'K-Town' Maddern - Trumpet
Ben 'Kid' Bell Bern - Trumpet

Jordan Cohen - Snare Drum
Chris diBernardo - Bass Drum
Matt Hanzelka - Trombone
Joe Goltz - Trombone
Darren Sterud - Trombone
Nat Macintosh - Trombone

Former
Dave Skogen - Snare Drum
Mike Boman
Steve Rogness
Nick Bartell
Evan 'Basic Sam' Morgan
Moses Patrou
Tom Leith
Scott Campbell
Ben Mcintosh
Michael Hanson

References

External links
Official Website

American brass bands
Musical groups from Wisconsin
Culture of Madison, Wisconsin
Musical groups established in 1993